Kilpi is a Finnish language surname which means "shield", most prevalent in Tavastia Proper. Notable people with the surname include:

Eero Kilpi (1882–1954), Finnish actor
Eeva Kilpi (born 1928), Finnish writer and feminist
Eino Kilpi (1889–1963), Finnish journalist and politician
Marko Kilpi (born 1969), Finnish crime writer, police officer and politician
Sylvi-Kyllikki Kilpi (1899–1987), Finnish journalist, literary critic and politician
Volter Kilpi (1874–1939), Finnish author 

Finnish-language surnames
Surnames of Finnish origin